This is a list of crime films released in 2006.

References

2000s
2006-related lists